Pramod Pappan are Indian screenwriter and film director duo. They started film direction with Vajram (2004), in which Mammootty played the lead role. They directed films such as Thaskaraveeran (2005), Abraham & Lincoln (2007), Mussafir (2013), Black Stallion (2009) and Bangkok Summer (2011).

Career 
Pramod and Pappan are brothers. Both of them started as entrepreneurs with the brandname "Lensman". Pramod, who was a photographer, was a friend of writer and director, A. K. Lohithadas. This friendship lead to Pramod's debut as still photographer in the film Joker (2000 film). Pramod Pappan as a duo directed a few albums. Later, Pramod Pappan made their directional debut with the Malayalam film, Vajram (2004 film).
Pramod Pappan's second directional venture was Thaskaraveeran (2005 film) starring Mammootty and Nayanthara.
The duo later directed a few more films, Mussafir (2013 film) being the last. The duo came back as executive producers in upcoming movie Velleppam. They are also running a celebrity event management named "Pramod Pappan Star Marshall".

Filmography

As director

References

External links 
 
 

Malayalam film directors
Malayalam screenwriters
Indian filmmaking duos
21st-century Indian film directors